Rhoda Ann Roberts  (born 1959) is an Australian actress, director and arts executive.

Early life and education 
Born in Canterbury Hospital in Sydney in 1959, Bundjalung woman Roberts grew up and completed Year 10 in Lismore, then moved back to Sydney where she qualified as a nurse in 1979.

Career 
Roberts co-starred with Rachael Maza and Lydia Miller in Belvoir Street Theatre's 1993 production of Louis Nowra's play Radiance. 

She was employed as presenter of Vox Populi, an SBS Television program, in 1990, becoming the first Indigenous Australian to present a prime time current affairs program. 

In 1995 she founded the Festival of Dreaming and was its director until 2009.

Roberts has been Head of Indigenous Programming at the Sydney Opera House since 2012.

Recognition 
Roberts was appointed an Officer of the Order of Australia (AO) in the 2016 Queen's Birthday Honours for "distinguished service to the performing arts through a range of leadership and advocacy roles in the development, promotion and presentation of contemporary Indigenous culture". 

She was honoured with one of the 2017 Centenary Sue Nattrass Awards presented at the 18th Helpmann Awards.

Penny Tweedie's image of Roberts is held by the National Portrait Gallery in Canberra.

Personal life 
Roberts married Steven Field, and they have three children.

References

External links 

 
 

1960 births
Living people
Bundjalung people 
Australian stage actresses
Australian theatre directors
Officers of the Order of Australia
20th-century Australian actresses
21st-century Australian actresses
Australian television actresses
Australian film actresses
Actresses from Sydney